Ankur Bhatia (born February 1985) is an Indian actor and model. He grew up in Bhopal, India. He made his acting debut in 2010 in Payal Sethi's Grant St. Shaving Co which was produced by Mira Nair. In 2012, he won the Best Actor Commendation Award at the NYU Tisch School of the Arts Film Festival for Coconut Grove. In 2013, Ankur played a negative role in a Bollywood/Tollywood film Zanjeer (2013 film)/Toofan, remake of Zanjeer. He appeared in  Apoorva Lakhia's Haseena, starring Shraddha Kapoor, which was released in the theatres on 18 August 2017. In 2020, he plays a pivotal role in Disney+ Hotstar show Aarya (Indian TV series), starring Sushmita Sen and directed by Ram Madhvani.

Early life
Ankur Bhatia was born in Bhopal, India. He moved to United States to pursue a master's degree in Mathematics and worked as an Actuary for top tier consulting firms. He changed his path to Acting as he wanted to become an actor from a very young age. Ankur attended the New York Film Academy to learn Filmmaking and Acting.

Acting career
Ankur Bhatia's film debut came in 2010 in Payal Sethi's "Grant St. Shaving Co." which was produced by Mira Nair. The film was selected in over 10 film festivals worldwide, including  Cannes Film Festival Short film Corner in France and River to River. Florence Indian Film Festival in Italy. It won best film awards in River to River. Florence Indian Film Festival,  Smalls Film Festival, London and Mexico International Film Festival, California.

In 2012, he won the Best Actor Commendation Award at the NYU Tisch School of the Arts Film Festival for the movie "Coconut Grove",  where he plays  a funny, street-smart waiter. Ankur recently finished shooting for an untitled film based on insider trading, inspired by Galleon Group Scandal involving South Asian bankers and consultants in New York City. The film also stars Poorna Jagannathan.

In 2013, Ankur Bhatia played a negative role in a remake of 1973 Bollywood film Zanjeer, directed by Apoorva Lakhia in Hindi and Telugu.

In 2016, he played the role of Baldev, husband of Dalbir Kaur, essayed by Aishwarya Rai Bachchan in Sarabjit directed by Omung Kumar.

In 2017, he played Shraddha Kapoor’s husband in Apoorva Lakhia’s film Haseena.

In 2020, he plays a pivotal role in Disney+ Hotstar show Aarya (Indian TV series) alongside Sushmita Sen directed by Ram Madhvani.

Filmography

Films

Television

External links

Indian male film actors
Indian male models
American male film actors
Living people
Male actors from Bhopal
University of Connecticut alumni
1982 births
Indian emigrants to the United States
American male actors of Indian descent
People from Bhopal